The Mannheim-Heidelberg International Film Festival, often referred to by the German-language initialism IFFMH, is an annual film festival established in 1952 hosted jointly by the cities of Mannheim and Heidelberg in Baden-Württemberg, the southwest region of Germany. 

The festival focuses on arthouse and auteur cinema produced by international newcomer directors, and historically it served as a springboard for many experimental filmmakers from cinemas that have been overlooked by Western audiences. It is the second-oldest film festival in Germany, behind only the Berlinale. Originally held in Mannheim, since 1994 is co-hosted by Mannheim and Heidelberg, two neighboring cities which are less than 20 kilometers away from each other. The festival usually takes places in October or November.

The last edition, the 70th IFFMH, was held in November 2021, and the next edition is scheduled to take place on 17–27 November 2022.

Festival profile
The International Filmfestival Mannheim-Heidelberg is aimed at industry professionals as well as cinema enthusiasts, with about 300 professional participants and approximately 50,000 visitors each year, it is one of the largest film festivals in Germany. After several screenings there are public panel discussions with the film's representatives (e. g. directors, actors or producers).

The festival presents films of independent newcomer directors and who are internationally widely-unknown, focussing on arthouse and auteur films. The films selected must be premieres and thus films screened at Cannes, Locarno, Venice and any German festival are excluded for the International Competition.

In 2010, the MANNHEIM MEETING PLACE was launched. The project succeeds the Festival's former co-production market MANNHEIM MEETINGS, focusing on the improvement of marketing opportunities of completed film projects. However, co-production meetings will still take place.
 
During the history of the festival, feature films by now-famous directors such as François Truffaut, Helke Sander, Rainer Werner Fassbinder, Kalthoum Bornaz, Jim Jarmusch, Shelley Saywell, Atom Egoyan, Krzysztof Kieślowski , Bryan Singer, Guillaume Nicloux, Lou Ye, Rafi Pitts, Thomas Vinterberg, Derek Cianfrance, Luca Guadagnino and Rahmin Bahrani were first introduced to an international public at the festival.

Competition and awards

Grand Newcomer Award Mannheim-Heidelberg for the best fiction feature film with a minimum length of 70 minutes.
Talent Award Mannheim-Heidelberg for the best unconventionally narrated feature film with a minimum length of 70 minutes. The prize can not be awarded ex aequo.
Special Jury Award of Mannheim-Heidelberg for a film with the minimum length of 70 minutes, or for an extraordinary performance as actor, writer, director etc. This prize can be awarded twice if required.
Special Mentions of Mannheim-Heidelberg for a memorial film or special achievements like acting, photography, music, and montage. Up to three special mentions can be awarded.
The International Film Critics Prize given by the FIPRESCI Jury for a film of the competition.
Prize of the Ecumenical Jury given by the Ecumenical Jury for a film of the competition.
Audience Award of Mannheim-Heidelberg for the film most liked by the Festival audience, regardless of genre and length.
Recommendations of the Jury of Cinema Owners for a film of the competition which should be released theatrically in Germany.

Master of Cinema Award
In addition, since 1998 in sporadic intervals, the honorary Master of Cinema Award is issued to outstanding cineastic artist:

2017 – István Szabó
2015 – Olivier Assayas
2009 – Atom Egoyan
2006 – Aleksandr Sokurov
2004 – Wim Wenders, Edgar Reitz
2003 – Raoul Ruiz
2002 – Zhang Yimou 
1999 – Otar Iosseliani
1998 – Theo Angelopoulos

New Master of Cinema Award
In addition, since 2013, the honorary New Master of Cinema Award is issued:

2014 – Geoffrey Enthoven
2013 – Frédéric Fonteyne

List of award winners

2021 

 Grand Newcomer Award Mannheim-Heidelberg Il Buco, Michelangelo Frammartino, Italy
 Rainer Werner Fassbinder Award – Best Screenplay Zero Fucks Given, Julie Lecoustre and Emmanuel Marre, France/Belgium
 Rainer Werner Fassbinder Award – Best Screenplay - Special Mention Haruhara-san's Recorder, Kyoshi Sugita, Japan
 FIPRESCI International Film Critics' Prize The Sleeping Negro, Skinner Myers, USA
 Prize of the Ecumenical Jury My Night, Antoinette Boulat, France/Belgium
 Award of the Student Jury The First Fallen, Rodrigo de Oliveira, Brazil
 Audience Award The First Fallen, Rodrigo de Oliveira,  Brazil

2020 

 Grand Newcomer Award Mannheim-Heidelberg My Mexican Breztel, Nuria Giménez Lorang, Spain
 Rainer Werner Fassbinder Award – Best Screenplay Single Cycle, Zhang Qi, China
 Rainer Werner Fassbinder Award – Best Screenplay - Special Mentions Come Closer, Saskia Walker and Ralf Walker, Germany; Beginning, Dea Kulumbegashvili, Georgia/France
 FIPRESCI International Film Critics' Prize My Mexican Breztel, Nuria Giménez Lorang, Spain
 Prize of the Ecumenical Jury Una promessa, Gianluca and Massimiliano De Serio, Italy/France/Belgium
 Prize of Ecumenical Jury - Special Mention The Slaughterhouse, Abbas Amini, Iran
 Award of the Student Jury Lorelei, Sabrina Doyle, USA
 Award of the Student Jury - Special Mention Shithouse, Cooper Raiff, USA
 Audience Award Lorelei, Sabrina Doyle, USA

2019 

 Grand Newcomer Award Mannheim-Heidelberg (ex aequo) The Grizzlies, Miranda de Pencier, Canada; On The Roof, Jirí Mádl, Czech Republic
 Talent Award Mannheim-Heidelberg Under the Turquoise Sky, KENTARO, Japan/Mongolia
 Special Award Mannheim-Heidelberg End of Sentence, Elfar Adalsteins, Iceland/Ireland/USA
 FIPRESCI International Film Critics' Prize Under the Turquoise Sky, KENTARO, Japan/Mongolia
 Prize of the Ecumenical Jury Rona Azim's Mother, Jamshid Mahmoudi, Afghanistan/Iran
 Special Mention of Mannheim-Heidelberg The Grizzlies, Miranda de Pencier, Canada
 Recommendations of the Jury of Cinema Owners The Grizzlies, Miranda de Pencier, Canada; On The Roof, Jirí Mádl, Czech Republic; Good Morning Son, Sharon Bar Ziv, Israel

2018 

 Grand Newcomer Award Mannheim-Heidelberg Orange Days, Arash Lahooti, Iran
 Talent Award Mannheim-Heidelberg The Fireflies Are Gone, Sébastien Pilote, Canada
 Special Award Mannheim-Heidelberg to the actor Christian Malheiros, Socrates, Brazil
 Special Mention Mannheim-Heidelberg to the actress Vivian Wu, Dead Pigs, China
 FIPRESCI International Film Critics' Prize Orange Days, Arash Lahooti, Iran
 Audience Award (International Competition Newcomer Films) Tazzeka, Jean-Philippe Gaud, France/Morocco
 Prize of the Ecumenical Jury Orange Days, Arash Lahooti, Iran
 Recommendations of the Jury of Cinema Owners The Fireflies Are Gone, Sébastien Pilote, Canada; Tazzeka, Jean-Philippe Gaud, France/Morocco; Orange Days by Arash Lahooti, Iran

2017 

 Grand Newcomer Award Mannheim-Heidelberg See you in Texas, Vito Palmieri, Italy
Special Newcomer Award Mannheim-Heidelberg Wailings in the forest, Bagane Fiola, The Philippines
Special Achievement Award Mannheim-Heidelberg to Sabit Kurmanbekov for the film Returnee, Kasachstan
Special Mention of Mannheim-Heidelberg to Alejandro Andujar for the film The Watchman, Dominican Republic
Special Mention of Mannheim-Heidelberg to Shady Srour for the screenplay to Holy Air, Israel
Special Mention of Mannheim-Heidelberg to Cezmi Baskin for the film Murtaza, Turkey
Audience Award (International Competition Newcomer Films) Life beyond me, Olivier Peyon, France/Uruguay
Audience Award (International Competition Newcomer Films) Zer, Kazim Öz, Turkey/Germany
FIPRESCI International Film Critics' Prize Zer, Kazim Öz, Turkey/Germany
Prize of the Ecumenical Jury Life beyond me, Olivier Peyon, France/Uruguay
Recommendation of the Jury of Cinema Owners Holy Air, Shady Srour, Israel,  Origami, Patrick Demers, Canada, While we live, Mehdi Avaz, Denmark

2016 
Grand Newcomer Award Mannheim-Heidelberg Reseba- The Dark Wind, Hussain Hassan Ali, Irak, Germany
Special Newcomer Award Mannheim-Heidelberg Wedding Dance - Kasap Havasi, Cigdem Sezgin, Turkey
Special Achievement Award Mannheim-Heidelberg to the actress Rimma Zyubina The Nest of the Turtledove, Ukraine
Special Achievement Award Mannheim-Heidelberg to the actor Majid Potki Another Time, Iran
Special Mentions of Mannheim-Heidelberg Train Driver's Diary, Milos Radovic, Serbia
Audience Award (International Competition Newcomer Films) Train Driver's Diary, Milos Radovic, Serbia
Audience Award (International Competition Newcomer Films) Moon Dog, Philipp John, Ireland
FIPRESCI International Film Critics' Prize To keep the light Erica Fae, USA
Prize of the Ecumenical Jury The Nest of the Turtledove Taras Tkachenko, Ukraine
Recommendation of the Jury of Cinema Owners Calico Skies Valerio Esposito, USA, Moon Dogs, Philipp John, Ireland, Train Driver's Diary Milos Radovic, Serbia

2015 
Grand Newcomer Award Mannheim-Heidelberg The Thin Yellow Line, Celso R. Garcia, Mexico
Special Newcomer Award Mannheim-Heidelberg 12 Months in 1 Day, Margot Schaap, The Netherlands
Special Achievement Award Mannheim-Heidelberg to the director Rebecca Cremona Simshar, Malta
Audience Award (International Competition Newcomer Films) Jeremy, Anwar Safa, Mexico
FIPRESCI International Film Critics' Prize 12 Months in 1 Day Margot Schaap, The Netherlands
Prize of the Ecumenical Jury Walking Distance Alejandro Guzmán Álvarez, Mexico
Recommendation of the Jury of Cinema Owners Home Care Slavek Horak, Czech Republic; Paradise Trips, Raf Reyntjens, Belgium; Jeremy Anwar Safa, Mexico
New Creators Award Mannheim-Heidelberg Occupied, Karianne Lund and Erik Skjoldbjærg, Norway
Audience Award (International Competition Serial Dramas) Familie Braun, Manuel Meimberg and Uwe Urbas , Germany

2014
Newcomer of the Year - Main Award of Mannheim-Heidelberg 23 Segundos (23 Seconds), Dimitry Rudakov, Uruguay
Special Award of Mannheim-Heidelberg Nabat, Elchin Musaoglu, Azerbaijan
Special Award of the International Jury A Despedida (Farewell), Marcelo Galvao, Brazil
Audience Award Ghadi, Amin Dora, Lebanon
FIPRESCI International Film Critics' Prize Nabat, Elchin Musaoglu, Azerbaijan
Prize of the Ecumenical Jury Nabat, Elchin Musaoglu, Azerbaijan
Recommendation of the Jury of Cinema Owners Patrick's Day Terry McMahon, Ireland, In the Crosswind, Martti Helde, Estonia

2013
Newcomer of the Year - Main Award of Mannheim-Heidelberg Melaza (Molasses), Carlos Lechuga, Cuba/France/Panama
Special Award of Mannheim-Heidelberg Madariinid (Tangerines), Zaza Urushadze, Estonia, Georgia
Special Award of the International Jury Før Snøen Faller Before Snowfall, Hisham Zaman, Norway/Germany/Iraq
Special Award of the International Jury Ghaedeye Tasadof (Bending the Rules), Behnam Behzadi, Iran
Special Mention of the International Jury De Nieuwe Wereld (The New World), Jaap van Heusden, Netherlands
Audience Award Mandariinid (Tangerines), Zaza Urushadze, Estonia, Georgia
FIPRESCI International Film Critics' Prize Drift Benny Vandendrissche, Belgium
Prize of the Ecumenical Jury Hemma (Home) Maximilian Hult, Sweden/Iceland
Recommendation of the Jury of Cinema Owners Razredni sovražnik (Class Enemy) Rok Biček, Slowenia;  Mandariinid (Tangerines) Zaza Urushadze, Estonia/Georgia; Cyanure (Cyanide) Séverine Cornamusaz, Switzerland/Canada

2012
Newcomer of the Year - Main Award of Mannheim-Heidelberg Soote Payan (Final Whistle), Niki Karimi, Iran
Rainer Werner Fassbinder Prize Lycka Till Och ta Hand om Varandra (Good Luck. And Take Care of Each Other), Jens Sjögren, Sweden
Special Award of the International Jury Tiempos Menos Modernos (Not So Modern Times), Simón Franco, Argentina/Chile
Special Mention of the International Jury When Yesterday Comes Hsiu-Chiung Chiang, Singing Chen, Wi-Ding Ho, Ko-Shang Shen, Taiwan
Audience Award Now, Forager. A Film About Love and Fungi, Jason Cortlund, Julia Halperin, USA/Poland
FIPRESCI International Film Critics' Prize Seenelkäik (Mushrooming) Toomas Hussar, Estonia
Prize of the Ecumenical Jury Le Sac de Farine (The Bag of Flour) Kadija Leclere, Belgium, Morocco
Special Mention of the Ecumenical Jury W Sypialni (In a Bedroom) Tomasz Wasilewski, Poland
Recommendation of the Jury of Cinema Owners La Niña (The Girl) David Riker, USA/UK/Mexico; Now, Forager. A Film About Love and Fungi, Jason Cortlund, Julia Halperin, USA/Poland; Silent City, Threes Anna, Netherlands/Belgium/Luxembourg

2011
Main Award of Mannheim-Heidelberg Parked, by Darragh Byrne, Ireland
Rainer Werner Fassbinder Prize Un Cuento Chino (Chinese Take-Away), Sebastián Borensztein, Argentina
Special Award of the International Jury Le Vendeur (The Salesman), Sébastien Pilote, Canada
Special Mention of the International Jury Rah Raftan Rouye Rail (Walking on the Rail), by Babak Shirinsefat, Iran; Laurent Capelluto for his performance in Fils unique (My Only Son) by Miel van Hoogenbemt, Belgium; and Piotr Niemyjski, director of photography, Lęk wysokości (Fear of Falling) by Bartosz Konopka, Poland
Audience Award Un Cuento Chino (Chinese Take-Away), Sebastián Borensztein, Argentina
FIPRESCI International Film Critics' Prize Le Vendeur (The Salesman), Sébastien Pilote, Canada
Prize of the Ecumenical Jury Bein Hashmashot (Dusk),  by Alon Zingman, Israel
Recommendations of the Jury of Cinema Owners Bein Hashmashot (Dusk), Alon Zingman, Israel; Elle ne pleure pas, elle chante (She's not crying, she's singing), Philippe de Pierpont, Belgium;  Un Amor (One Love), Paula Hernández, Argentina

2010
Main Award of Mannheim-Heidelberg 10½, by Daniel Grou, Canada
Rainer Werner Fassbinder Prize Xun huan zuo le (The High Life), by Zhao Dayong, China
Special Award of the International Jury Siyah Beyaz (Black and White), by Ahmet Boyacioglu, Turkey
Special Mention of the International Jury Act of Dishonour, by Nelofer Pazira, Canada and Alicia Vikander for her performance in  Till det som är vackert (Pure), by Lisa Langseth, Sweden
Audience Award Eva y Lola by Sabrina Farji, Argentina and Hold om mig (Hold me tight), by Kaspar Munk, Denmark
FIPRESCI International Film Critics' Prize Xun huan zuo le (The High Life), by Zhao Dayong, China
Prize of the Ecumenical Jury Hold om mig (Hold me tight),  by Kaspar Munk, Denmark
Recommendations of the Jury of Cinema Owners Till det som är vackert (Pure), Lisa Langseth, Sweden; Win/Win, Jaap van Heusden, The Netherlands; Planes para Mañana, Juana Macías, Spain

2009
Main Award of Mannheim-Heidelberg Postia Pappi Jaakobille (Letters to Father Jacob), Klaus Härö, Finland
Rainer Werner Fassbinder Prize Miss Kicki, Hakon Liu, Sweden
Special Award of the International Jury Demsala Dawî: Sewaxan (The Last Season: Shawaks), Kazim Öz, Turkey
Special Mention of the International Jury Jonathan Parker for (Untitled), USA ; Séverine Cornamusaz for Coeur Animal (Animal Heart), Switzerland
Audience Award Nurse.Fighter.Boy, Charles Officer, Canada
FIPRESCI International Film Critics' Prize Coeur Animal (Animal Heart), Séverine Cornamusaz, Switzerland
Prize of the Ecumenical Jury Coeur Animal (Animal Heart), Séverine Cornamusaz, Switzerland
Recommendations of the Jury of Cinema Owners Retorno a Hansala (Return to Hansala), Chus Gutiérrez, Spain; (Untitled), Jonathan Parker, USA; Nurse.Fighter.Boy, Charles Officer, Canada

2008
Main Award of Mannheim-Heidelberg Lluvia (Rain), Paula Hernández, Argentina
Rainer Werner Fassbinder Prize Un roman policier (A Police Romance), Stéphanie Duvivier, France
Special Award of the International Jury Másik Bolygó (Another Planet), Ferenc Moldoványi, Hungary
Special Mention of the International Jury Isabelle Blais for outstanding performance in Borderline, Canada; Lee Chi Yuan for Luan Qing Chun (Beautiful Crazy), Taiwan; K. M. Madhusudhanan for Bioscope, India
Audience Award Amanecer de un sueño (Awaking From a Dream), Freddy Mas Franqueza, Spain
FIPRESCI International Film Critics' Prize Borderline, Lyne Charlebois, Canada
Prize of the Ecumenical Jury Borderline, Lyne Charlebois, Canada
Recommendations of the Jury of Cinema Owners 14 kilometros (14 Kilometers), Gerardo Olivares, Spain; Borderline, Lyne Charlebois, Canada; Les murs porteurs (Cycles), Cyril Gelblat, France

References

External links

 
 Mannheim-Heidelberg International Film Festival at the Internet Movie Database

Tourist attractions in Mannheim
Tourist attractions in Heidelberg
1952 establishments in West Germany
Film festivals in Germany
Film festivals established in 1952
Culture of Baden-Württemberg
Annual events in Germany